Elizabeth Hernandez, or Elizabeth Hernández may refer to:

 Elizabeth Hernández (artist) (born 1993), Mexican-born American visual artist and designer.
 Elizabeth Hernández (model), Puerto Rican television personality, author, spokesperson, professional model, entrepreneur, and motivational speaker
 Elizabeth Hernandez (politician) (born 1961), American politician, member of the Illinois House of Representatives
 Elizabeth Newell Hernandez (born 1982), American female road and track cyclist.